Admiralty tugs were tugboats built for and operated by the Royal Navy. These were vessels built to Admiralty specifications and in specific classes during the First and Second World Wars. They were built to meet the Royal Navy's demand for auxiliary vessels and to supplement the civilian tugs requisitioned by the Admiralty for war service.

First World War
At the outbreak of the First World War the Royal Navy owned seven fleet tugs, mainly civilian vessels purchased as required, employed in normal tug duties at naval ports. When war commenced the Admiralty put in train plans to requisition civilian tugs to meet the need for vessels to work as patrol vessels, minesweepers, anti-submarine warfare vessels and a host of routine duties. In all, over 100 civilian tugs were requisitioned in this way.

There was an increased need for boats to act on the salvage and rescue of ships attacked and damaged on the high seas, for which the civilian fleet was not sufficient. To meet this need the Admiralty placed an order for 64 sea-going tugs to operate in this capacity. These were to a single design, based on a civilian type, and, as they were built by specialist shipyards, incorporated merchant rather than navy features. However it was specified they be armed and equipped with radio.

The main class of Admiralty tug was the Saint class. Of 64 ordered, 46 were completed and commissioned before the end of hostilities.  
The second class was the Resolve (also called Rollicker) class, 6 large ocean-going tugs for duty on the high seas, but these were incomplete at the war's end. Their names were Resolve, Respond, Retort, Rollicker, Roysterer, and Rollcall.

In addition the Admiralty built several classes of small tugs, including 10 Robust-class paddle tugs, and 6 West-class harbour tugs, and several classes of tugs for special duties. 15 vessels were built to tugboat design for use as boarding vessels in the Thames estuary and another 13 for use in the Mersey. They also built 24 tugs (the Concrete class) employed towing ferro-concrete barges between England and France.

First World War tugs

Second World War
In World War II a similar situation arose; the Admiralty again requisitioned civilian tugs and placed orders for a range of Admiralty tugs. In all 117 harbour tugs were brought into service, including the ten Robust- and six West-class vessels (built in World War I and now in civilian service) and 101 others of various design. Just two harbour tugs were built for the Admiralty during World War II, the  Alligator-class.

Prior to 1939 the Royal Navy had built four Brigand-class rescue tugs for its own use; at the outbreak of World War II a further 74 civilian tugs were requisitioned, including 16 Saint and five Rollicker class of World War I vintage, and 53 others. In 1942 a further 23 , and eight  tugs were built, followed in 1944 by six  tugs. A number of US Rescue Tugs were also supplied under the Lend-Lease programme. These long-range Rescue Tugs were ocean-going ships which often accompanied convoys and operated in all theatres of the war. They were largely crewed by experienced Merchant Seamen recruited into the Royal Navy under T124 articles and formed a specialist unit known as His Majesty's Rescue Tug Service (commanded from HMS Minona moored in Campbeltown in Scotland). These vessels were supplemented by a number of similar vessels owned by the Ministry of War Transport (MoWT) and operated on their behalf by private shipping companies (notably the United Towing Company based in Hull). Most of the RN and MoWT Rescue Tugs were disposed of at the war's end.)

Second World War tugs

The Royal Naval tugs and small auxiliaries were formed by the Royal Maritime Auxiliary Service, manned by MoD employed civilian crews. However this was outsourced to a private company Serco-Denholm slightly prior to the year 2000. Initially the vessels were still MoD owned but the crews and manning were privatised. The remaining vessels were later sold to Serco-Denholm  changing from the old black and buff colour scheme of the RMAS to black and white. All the vessels now carry the initials SD prior to their name.

Characteristics
Admiralty tugs were built to Navy specifications, and standardized where possible to a single design, though this was based on a civilian type. In this they followed the pattern of other auxiliary vessels, such as the Admiralty trawlers, and the s. They were built by shipyards specializing in tug construction, and thus incorporated merchant rather than navy features, such as an enclosed bridge, and wooden superstructure. However, it was specified they be armed and equipped with radio. The First World War vessels had at least one gun, for self-defence, and smoke-generating gear. In World War II they also carried anti-aircraft guns for protection against air attack.

Construction list
One of the builders of these tugs was Henry Robb Ltd. Below is a list of Bustler-class ocean rescue/salvage tugs built during World War II. These were powered by diesel engines.

1941/42
Built and launched in 1941/42 were: 
 HMRT Bustler
 HMRT Samsonia Post-war, Samsonia was leased by Foundation Maritime in Halifax, Nova Scotia, and operated as Foundation Josephine. She is featured prominently in Farley Mowat's book The Serpent's Coil.
 HMRT Growler
 HMRT Hesperia

1944/45
Built in 1944/45 were: 
 HMRT Mediator
 HMRT Reward
 HMRT Turmoil
 HMRT Warden

See also
 The Key (1958 film)

References

Notes

Bibliography

External links
 WWII Harbour tugs at uboat.net 
 WWII Rescue tugs at uboat.net

Tugboats of the United Kingdom
Ship types
Tugboats of the Royal Navy
Auxiliary tugboat classes